Saurimo, formerly known as Henrique de Carvalho, is a city in Angola, capital of the Lunda Sul Province. Saurimo has a population of 393,000 (2014). The population has swollen as a result of migrants fleeing civil conflict.

History 
Formerly the town was known as Henrique De Carvalho, after the Portuguese explorer who visited the region in 1884 and contacted the local, and historically powerful, Lunda people.

Geography
It is a garrison town and local market centre.

Economy
The main economic activities nowadays are agriculture and diamonds.

The main foodstuffs are mandioc, corn, sweet potato and yam.

Other activities are handicraft, fishing, and diamond panning.

The SMC (Sociedade Mineira de Catoca) is one of the world's largest mining area along with Endiama which helps distribute its diamonds worldwide.

Notable people
Here are some of the notable people from this small town:

 Yola Araújo is an Angolan songwriter and musician. She's been in the music industry for over 10 years.

 Daniel Félix Neto, Saurimo's current governor since 2018.

 Tonilson B.J. Luis is a young Angolan internet personality, dancer, former fashion model, part-time singer, writer & songwriter, also known as TJ. He is vegetarian and an activist in a small extent. He also plays basketball and likes computing. He has a YouTube channel,  a Vimeo, Instagram, Twitter, TikTok, Triller, Facebook and Snapchat accounts.

References

Provincial capitals in Angola
Populated places in Lunda Sul Province